This is a list of mountains in Uganda.
 Mount Stanley (5,109 m)
 Mount Elgon (4,321 m)
 Mount Moroto (3,083 m)
 Mount Kadam (3,063 m) 
 Mount Morungole (2,750 m) 
 Mount Zulia (2,149 m)

References

 
Uganda
Mountains
Uganda